John Anderson Bensel (August 16, 1863 – June 19, 1922) was an American civil engineer and politician from New York. He was President of the American Society of Civil Engineers in 1910. He was New York State Engineer and Surveyor from 1911 to 1914.

Biography
He was born on August 16, 1863, in New York City to Brownlee Bensel and Mary Maclay Hogg. He graduated from Stevens Institute of Technology in 1884, and became an assistant engineer with the Aqueduct Commission. Then he worked for the Pennsylvania Railroad, and from 1889 to 1895 was in charge of constructions on New York City's North River waterfront.

In 1896, he married Ella Louise Day. The same year he became Consulting Engineer of the Philadelphia Water Department. In 1898, he became Chief Engineer of the New York City Dock Department, and in 1906 was appointed a Dock Commissioner.

From 1908 to 1910, he was President of the New York City Board of Water Supply. He was New York State Engineer and Surveyor from 1911 to 1914, elected on the Democratic ticket in 1910 and 1912, but defeated for re-election in 1914.

In 1914, he was investigated during Charles S. Whitman's graft investigation, but was cleared of all suspicions by his successor Frank M. Williams after the latter inspected the department's accounts in 1915.

As a major, he commanded the 125th Battalion of Engineers of the U.S. Army during World War I.

He died of myelitis on June 19, 1922, in Bernardsville, New Jersey at age 58. He was buried in Green-Wood Cemetery in Brooklyn, New York.

Legacy

Bensel's New Jersey mansion, which was built in 1905 and was named "Queen Anne Farm", is now Cross Estate Gardens and part of the Morristown National Historic Park.  The surrounding grounds are open to visitors and contain a five-story stone water tower and a large Silver Maple tree planted by Bensel in 1906.

References

External links
Appointed Pres. of the Water Supply Board, in NYT on January 31, 1908, with short bio
The water supply labor contracts, in NYT on November 3, 1910
Whitman's graft hunt, in NYT on January 26, 1914
Bensel refuses to waive immunity and does not testify, in NYT on February 18, 1914
The Sullivan Committee's graft hunt, in NYT on March 5, 1914
Bensel refuese to waive immunity, the garft hunt continues, in NYT on April 3, 1914
Bensel's administration under scrutiny, in NYT on January 5, 1915
Bensel vindicated by Williams, in NYT on January 25, 1915
Am. Soc. of Civil Eng., Presidents
 

1863 births
1922 deaths
Burials at Green-Wood Cemetery
New York State Engineers and Surveyors
Politicians from New York City
American civil engineers
Stevens Institute of Technology alumni
United States Army officers
People from Bernardsville, New Jersey
Engineers from New Jersey
Military personnel from New Jersey